Dirk Hartog Island is an island off the Gascoyne coast of Western Australia, within the Shark Bay World Heritage Area.

Known as Wirruwana by the traditional owners of the island, the Malgana people, it was given its present name by Europeans. It was named after Dirk Hartog, a Dutch sea captain who first encountered the Western Australian coastline close to the 26th parallel south latitude, which runs through the island, around 1616. After leaving the island, Hartog continued his voyage north-east along the mainland coast. Hartog gave the Australian mainland one of its earliest known names, as Eendrachtsland, which he named after his ship Eendracht, meaning "concord". The island is now the location of a major environmental reconstruction project, Return to 1616, that has seen all introduced livestock and feral animals removed, with eleven native species now in various stages of reintroduction.

History

The island was discovered by Hartog on 25 October 1616 in the Dutch East India Company (VOC) ship Eendracht from Cape Town to Batavia (Jakarta). The names of senior people on board, including Hartog's, were inscribed with the date on a pewter plate and nailed to a post.

In 1697 the Dutch captain Willem de Vlamingh landed on the island and discovered Hartog's plate. He replaced it with one of his own, which included a copy of Hartog's inscription, and took the original plate home to Amsterdam, where it is still kept in the Rijksmuseum Amsterdam.

On 28 March 1772, Breton navigator Louis Aleno de St Aloüarn landed on the island and became the first European to formally take possession of Western Australia in the name of the French king Louis XV. This involved a ceremony (which took place on 30 March) during which one or more bottles were buried on the island. One bottle was recorded as containing an annexation document and a coin. In 1998 a bottle cap made of lead with an écu coin set in it was first discovered at Turtle Bay by a team led by Philippe Godard and Max Cramer. This triggered a broader search by a team from the Western Australian Museum led by Myra Stanbury, with Bob Sheppard, Bob Creasy and Dr Michael McCarthy. On 1 April 1998, an intact bottle bearing a lead cap identical to the one recovered earlier, also with a coin set in it, was unearthed. No trace of an annexation document has yet been found.

In 1801 the island was visited by a French expedition aboard the Naturaliste led by Captain Emmanuel Hamelin. This expedition found de Vlamingh's plate almost buried in the sand, its post having rotted away. The Captain ordered that it be re-erected in its original position. In 1818 the Uranie with French explorer Louis de Freycinet, who had been an officer in Hamelin's 1801 crew, sent a boat ashore to recover de Vlamingh's plate. It eventually arrived in Paris, only to be lost for over a century. It was found in 1940 and returned to Australia in 1947, where it can now be seen in the Western Australian Maritime Museum in Fremantle, Western Australia. The Baudin expedition left also a plaque at the island at 16 July 1801.

In 1869, Francis Louis von Bibra (son of Franz Ludwig von Bibra) was granted a lease on the island.  Von Bibra established sheep on the island and traded guano from its bays.

The leasehold for the island was acquired by the Withnell brothers from Messrs Moore and Meade in 1907. The island was regarded as an ideal place for a sheep station as there was no danger of rabbit invasion. In 1909 it was carrying a flock of about 12,000 sheep and produced approximately 400 bales of wool. The property was still owned by John and James Withnell, the children of John and Emma Withnell who were early settlers in the Pilbara. The brothers had estimated the area of the island to be  and intended to increase the flock on the island to 25,000. By 1910 the flock size was 14,200.

By 1919 the pastoral lease was put up for auction by the owner James Nicholas who also owned Croydon and Peron Peninsula Stations.

Perth Lord Mayor Sir Thomas Wardle purchased the island as a private retreat for his family in about 1969 and later retired there, becoming a semi-recluse with his wife.  With the exception of the pastoral homestead, the island later returned to government ownership and became part of the Shark Bay Marine Park. It is now run as an eco-tourism resort and maintained by Wardle's grandson, Kieran Wardle.

Geography 
The northerly most point Cape Inscription is the location of the plates and the main lighthouse.

The bay facing north next to Cape Inscription  is known as Turtle Bay.

Land use 
The island consists mostly of scrub-covered sand dunes. At times it has been used as a sheep station and supported 20,000 head of sheep at one stage. The island is now Dirk Hartog Island National Park and sheep have been removed.  To the east it is bounded by the Shark Bay Marine Park, and it is part of Shark Bay World Heritage Area.  A small area is leased to the Wardle family who runs it as a tourism destination.  The region is widely used for recreational fishing.

Wildlife and conservation 
Dirk Hartog Island is an important nesting site for loggerhead sea turtle, with green turtles and loggerhead turtles both nesting on the beaches. It is also home for the endemic subspecies of the white-winged fairy-wren.

In October 2018, at the end of a 20-year project, the island was declared free of feral cats, goats and sheep, paving the way for the reintroduction of 11 native animals, most of which had disappeared following a century and a half of pastoral activity and predation.

The "Return to 1616" environmental reconstruction project involves returning nine native species confirmed to have once been present on the island: the western barred bandicoot, burrowing bettong, Shark Bay mouse, greater stick-nest rat, western thick-billed grasswren, brush-trailed bettong, heath mouse, desert mouse, mulgara, dibbler and chuditch. Two additional mammal species that are thought likely to have once been present on the island, the rufous hare-wallaby and banded hare-wallaby, are also included in the faunal reconstruction, and were the first to be returned following the eradication of feral cats in September 2017.

The western barred bandicoot and the dibbler were returned in October 2019. The Shark Bay mouse and the greater stick-nest rat were reintroduced to the island in April and May of 2021, respectively, with early monitoring suggesting ongoing survival. The western thick-billed grasswren was returned in October 2022, with 85 birds translocated to the island from two distinct mainland populations at Shark Bay. 

Proof that dibblers were reproducing on the island was established in June 2021. By November 2022, all six reintroduced mammal species were described as breeding and establishing new territories on the island.

See also
 Caert van't Landt van d'Eendracht, an early Dutch map of the region
 Meade Island is linked to Dirk Hartog Island at low tide
 French Western Australia

References

Further reading

Green, J., (ed.) Report on the 2006 Western Australian Museum, Department of Maritime Archaeology, Cape Inscription National Heritage Listing Archaeological Survey. Report—Department of Maritime Archaeology Western Australian Museum, No. 223 Special Publication No. 10, Australian National Centre of Excellence for Maritime Archaeology

External links
 Dirk Hartog Island website
 Map of the island
 Rijksmuseum Amsterdam detail of plate
  Western Australian Museum plate site

Islands of Shark Bay
Maritime history of the Dutch East India Company
National parks of Western Australia